Terry Ronald Tiffee (born April 21, 1979) is an American former professional baseball infielder. He played in Major League Baseball for the Minnesota Twins and Los Angeles Dodgers.

Career
After his time at Pratt, Tiffee signed a letter of intent to play baseball at Louisiana State University, but chose instead to sign with the Minnesota Twins (scout Gregg Miller) when he was acquired in the 26th round of the June 1999 free agent draft.

Tiffee played with the Rochester Red Wings in the  Governor's Cup International League Championship Series. Rochester lost the series 3-2.

After playing parts of three seasons for the Twins from -, Tiffee signed a minor league deal with the Baltimore Orioles on January 5, . On November 29, 2007, Tiffee signed a minor league contract with the Los Angeles Dodgers and was assigned to play for the Triple-A Las Vegas 51s.

On May 25, Tiffee's contract was purchased by the Dodgers, and he was added to the active roster. He singled in his first at-bat for the Dodgers as a pinch hitter that same day. He compiled a .250 average in six games with the Dodgers before being designated for assignment on June 7, 2008, to make room for Ángel Berroa. He cleared waivers and was optioned back to Las Vegas. He signed a minor league contract with the Philadelphia Phillies on December 17, 2008.

Tiffee began 2011 with the Lancaster Barnstormers in independent baseball. He signed a minor league contract with the New York Yankees on June 22, 2011, and was assigned to the Triple-A Scranton/Wilkes-Barre Yankees. He was released on August 22.

The Miami Marlins signed him to a minor league contract on January 19, 2012. He signed a minor league deal with the Atlanta Braves on July 12, 2012 and was assigned to the Gwinnett Braves. He elected free agency on November 2, 2012.

2008 USA Baseball Olympic Team
Tiffee had 351 at bats with Triple-A Las Vegas and was batting .376 with 8 home runs, 36 doubles, and 61 Runs batted in when he was announced as a member of the U.S. Olympic Baseball Team.

Personal
Tiffee met his wife, Kelli, in Liberal, Kansas where he was playing fall league. They have a daughter and twin sons.

References

External links

1979 births
Living people
Baseball players at the 2008 Summer Olympics
Baseball players from Arkansas
Fort Myers Miracle players
Grand Canyon Rafters players
Gwinnett Braves players
Lancaster Barnstormers players
Las Vegas 51s players
Lehigh Valley IronPigs players
Los Angeles Dodgers players
Major League Baseball third basemen
Medalists at the 2008 Summer Olympics
Minnesota Twins players
Naranjeros de Hermosillo players
American expatriate baseball players in Mexico
New Britain Rock Cats players
Norfolk Tides players
Olympic bronze medalists for the United States in baseball
People from North Little Rock, Arkansas
People from Sherwood, Arkansas
Quad Cities River Bandits players
Rochester Red Wings players
Scranton/Wilkes-Barre Yankees players
Sylvan Hills High School alumni
Tiburones de La Guaira players
Tigres de Aragua players
American expatriate baseball players in Venezuela
Venados de Mazatlán players